Catherine Christine Eléonore Boyer (3 July 1771 – 14 May 1800) was a member of the Bonaparte family as the first wife of Lucien Bonaparte, a younger brother of Napoleon.

Life 
Born in Saint-Maximin-la-Sainte-Baume, France, Boyer was the daughter of Pierre André Boyer and Rosalie Fabre. Other explain that she was the sister of an innkeeper with whom Lucien had lodged in Saint-Maximin-la-Sainte-Baume. Christine was illiterate, and unable to sign her own name.

Bonaparte and Boyer married on 4 May 1794. The couple were married hastily, and without the consent of the Bonaparte family. Lucien's brother Napoleon and their mother, Letizia, were displeased with the match.

Issue 
The couple had four children, of whom two daughters had descendants.

 Filistine Charlotte (Saint-Maximin, 28 February 1795 – 1865, Rome); married first, 1815, Prince Mario Gabrielli. She married secondly, 1842, Cavaliere Settimio Centamori. She had eight children by her first husband:
 a son (1796–1796) ;
 Victoire Gertrude (1797–1797) ;
 Christine-Egypta (Paris, 18 October 1798 – Rome, 1847); married first, 1818, Count Arvid Posse. This ended in divorce in 1824. She married secondly, 1824, Lord Dudley Stuart. She had one child, a son, by her second husband.

Death 
Boyer died in Paris, in childbirth. She was buried in the Santi Apostoli Giovanni e Andrea cemetery in Canino, Lazio, Italy.

Bibliography
 Lucien Bonaparte à Saint-Maximin, Yacinthe Saint-German Leca

References 

1771 births
1800 deaths
Boyer
Princesses of France (Bonaparte)
Princesses by marriage
18th-century French women
18th-century French people